Holy Trinity Episcopal Church (also known as the Church of the Holy Trinity) is an Episcopal Church located in Georgetown, Kentucky.

History
The Church of the Holy Trinity was organized in 1847. The church building was constructed during the years 1864-1868 by John and Henry Clarke. The stone for the church was quarried from the actual site. The church was consecrated on June 23, 1870. A parish hall was added to the property in 1966. The free-standing building is compatible with the Gothic architecture of the church building. Adjacent to the church is a memorial garden with a columbarium for the interment of those choosing cremation.

The church building is designated a Kentucky Landmark and is on the National Register of Historic Places.

References

External links

Holy Trinity Episcopal Church web site

Episcopal church buildings in Kentucky
Buildings and structures in Georgetown, Kentucky
National Register of Historic Places in Scott County, Kentucky
Churches on the National Register of Historic Places in Kentucky
1867 establishments in Kentucky
Gothic Revival church buildings in Kentucky
Churches completed in 1867
Individually listed contributing properties to historic districts on the National Register in Kentucky